Ralph Votrian (May 16, 1934 – April 13, 2017) was an American film, television and voice actor. 

Votrian was born in Chicago, Illinois. As a child, Votrian performed on old-time radio programs. He graduated from John Burroughs High School in Burbank, California, and served in the United States Marine Corps. He appeared in the films Girls in the Night, The Bold and the Brave, Until They Sail, The Happy Years, Screaming Eagles, The Young Guns and Pillars of the Sky.

Votrian guest-starred in television programs including The Twilight Zone, Johnny Ringo, Black Saddle, Dr. Hudson's Secret Journal, The Tall Man, Rescue 8 and Rawhide. He provided additional voices for television programs such as El-Hazard, As Told by Ginger, Masked Rider (as King Lexian) Rave Master and Gatchaman (OVA), and was the narrator for Reign: The Conqueror.

Votrian died in April 2017 in Burbank, California, at the age of 82.

References

External links 

Rotten Tomatoes profile

1934 births
2017 deaths
People from Chicago
Male actors from Chicago
Male actors from Illinois
American male television actors
American male child actors
American male film actors
American male radio actors
American male voice actors
20th-century American male actors